Joseph Rooney (2 February 1917 – 5 May 1941) was an English professional footballer who played as a central defender in the Football League for Wolverhampton Wanderers.

Personal life
Rooney served as a private in the Gloucestershire Regiment during the Second World War. Deployed to Northern Ireland in late 1940, Rooney signed for Portadown in December 1940, but is not known to have appeared for the team. He was killed on 5 May 1941 during the Belfast Blitz and was buried at Walker (Christ Church) Churchyard.

Career statistics

References

1917 births
1941 deaths
Footballers from Newcastle upon Tyne
Association football central defenders
English footballers
English Football League players
Walker Celtic F.C. players
Wolverhampton Wanderers F.C. players
Portadown F.C. players
Gloucestershire Regiment soldiers
British Army personnel killed in World War II
Deaths by airstrike during World War II
Military personnel from Newcastle upon Tyne
Burials in North East England